Childtimes: A Three-Generation Memoir is a 1979 book about three women's remembrances of their childhoods from the late 19th century through the 20th century: children's author Eloise Greenfield, her mother, Lessie Jones Little, and her grandmother, Pattie Ridley Jones.

Reception
The Horn Book Magazine, in a discussion of school-age memoirs, wrote of Childtimes, "Readers experience the accumulated joys and sorrows of one family’s history ... Illustrations by Jerry Pinkney, along with period photographs, enhance the stories’ emotional and historical relevance for middle graders." The Washington Post recommended Childtimes "for all parents who wish to present to their children the very best in literature."

It has also been reviewed by Publishers Weekly, School Library Journal, and Hurricane Alice magazine.

Awards
 1980 Boston Globe–Horn Nonfiction Book Award - honor
 1980 Coretta Scott King Award author - honor

References

1979 children's books
American children's books
American memoirs
Childhood in the United States
Picture books by Jerry Pinkney
Children's history books
Literature by African-American women